The Social Liberal Party (PSL) was a far-right political party in Brazil, that merged with the Democrats and founded the Brazil Union. Founded in 1994 as a social-liberal political party, the PSL was registered on the Superior Electoral Court in 1998.

In January 2018, former Social Christian Party politician Jair Bolsonaro joined the party and later converted it into an economically liberal, Brazilian nationalist, radically anti-communist and social conservative party. The original name remained after the ideological shift, and after Livres (the party's original main wing) left the party and formed their own political movement to continue the party's original goals. Bolsonaro became the party's nominee for the 2018 Brazilian general election and won in both rounds. Bolsonaro left the party in 2019 after disagreements with its president, Luciano Bivar, and then founded Alliance for Brazil.

On October 6, 2021, the party voted to merge with the Democrats to establish the Brazil Union party.

History 

PSL was originally founded on 30 October 1994 by businessman Luciano Bivar as a social liberal party. It was registered on the Superior Electoral Court on 2 June 1998.

In the 2002 legislative elections, PSL won 1 out of 513 seats in the Chamber of Deputies and no seats in the Federal Senate. In the 2006 legislative elections, the party won no seats in the Chamber of Deputies or the Federal Senate. In the 2010 legislative elections, PSL won 1 seat in the Chamber of Deputies and no seats in the Federal Senate, maintaining the same results in the 2014 legislative elections.

In 2015, PSL underwent a reform led by the internal social liberal wing Livres, with names such as political scientist  and journalist Leandro Narloch reinforcing the party's affiliation with social liberal policies. PSL also supported the impeachment of former president Dilma Rousseff.

On 5 January 2018, conservative and former Social Christian politician Jair Bolsonaro became a member of the party, which prompted the Livres wing to leave the party in protest of Bolsonaro's social conservative views. After the exit of Livres, the party followed a national conservative path, changed its colors from purple to the more nationalist blue, yellow and green (the colors of Brazil's flag) and since then has discussed a name change either to Republicans (Republicanos) or Mobilize (Mobiliza). On 5 March 2018, Bivar stepped down from party's presidency and Gustavo Bebianno was appointed as acting president.

Bolsonaro eventually became PSL's nominee for the 2018 presidential election, exceeding polling forecasts to receive 46% of the popular vote in the first round. Bolsonaro's coattails helped elect 52 deputies and 4 senators from PSL, which made it the second largest political party in the post-2018 Chamber of Deputies. It also became the largest single party in the legislative assemblies of both Rio de Janeiro and São Paulo. On 28 October 2018, Bolsonaro was elected president with 55.13% of the votes, defeating Workers' Party's Fernando Haddad. He took office on 1 January 2019.

On 29 October 2018, Bivar was re-appointed as party's president. On 12 November 2019, Bolsonaro announced his departure from the party following disagreements with the national executive.

On October 6, 2021, the party voted to merge with the Democrats (DEM) to establish the Brazil Union party. The new party plans to use the number 44 as its electoral number. The merger was approved by the Superior Electoral Court and officially became registered on 8 February 2022. As such, both PSL and DEM were disbanded.

Organization

Ideology and policies 
Since Bolsonaro's entrance in the party, PSL has changed much of its ideologies. It went from a social-liberal party with an economic liberal group Livres to a far-right and right-wing populist party, abandoning its former cultural liberalism and keeping its economic liberal policies, supporting privatisation and decentralisation, while at the same time adopting cultural conservatism as well as social-conservative policies regarding abortion, legalization of marijuana, and teaching of gender identity in schools.

Electoral  history

Presidential elections

Legislative elections

See also 
 Patriota

References

1994 establishments in Brazil
Anti-communism in Brazil
Anti-communist parties
Conservative parties in Brazil
Far-right political parties in Brazil
Federalist parties
Militarism
National conservative parties
Nationalist parties in Brazil
Opposition to feminism
Organizations that oppose LGBT rights
Political parties established in 1994
Political parties in Brazil
Right-wing populism in South America
Right-wing populist parties
Social conservative parties
Defunct political parties in Brazil
2022 disestablishments in Brazil
Far-right political parties